Vanilla raabii is a species of orchid in the genus Vanilla. It is endemic to the Philippines and can be found on Luzon, the Panay Peninsula, and Samar.

It is a climbing epiphytic orchid with terete roots and stems with oval to lanceolate leaves that are fleshy and thick.

References

External links
 

raabii
Endemic orchids of the Philippines
Flora of Luzon